The Ruvubu River (also spelt Rurubu and Ruvuvu) is a river in central Africa whose waters gather from the most distant, southern portion of the Nile basin. It rises in the north of Burundi, near the town of Kayanza and then does a southward arc through Burundi, being joined by the Ruvyironza River near Gitega. From there it runs northeast, through the Ruvubu National Park, up to the Tanzanian border. After a stretch along the border, the Ruvubu crosses properly into Tanzania, before joining the Nyabarongo River on the Tanzania–Rwanda border near Rusumo Falls, to form the Kagera River.

The Ruvubu gets its name from the Kirundi word for hippopatamus, imvubu, because the river is home to a large population of hippos.

References

Rivers of Burundi
Rivers of Tanzania
Kagera River
International rivers of Africa
Burundi–Tanzania border
Border rivers